This is a list of seasons completed by the Temple Owls football team of the National Collegiate Athletic Association (NCAA) Division I Football Bowl Subdivision (FBS).

Seasons

Sources:

Coaching history

References

Temple

Temple Owls football seasons